Lares is a mountain town and municipality of Puerto Rico's central-western area. Lares is located north of Maricao and Yauco; south of Camuy, east of San Sebastián and Las Marias; and west of Hatillo, Utuado and Adjuntas. Lares is spread over 10 barrios and Lares Pueblo (Downtown Lares). It is part of the Aguadilla-Isabela-San Sebastián Metropolitan Statistical Area.

A city adorned with Spanish-era colonial-style churches and small downtown stores, Lares is located on a breezy area that is about 1.5 hours from San Juan by car.

Lares was the site of the 1868 El Grito de Lares (literally, The Cry of Lares, or Lares Revolt), an uprising brought on by pro-independence rebels who wanted Puerto Rico to gain its freedom from Spain. Even though it was soon extinguished it remains an iconic historical event in the history of the island.

History

Lares was founded on April 26, 1827, by Francisco de Sotomayor and Pedro Vélez Borrero, who named the town after Amador de Lariz, a Spanish nobleman and one of its settlers.

El Grito de Lares ("Cry of Lares") was a rebellion that began on September 23, 1868, against repression by Spain and has served as a symbol of Puerto Rico's fight for independence since. Historian Fernando Picó described it thus:

The flag of Lares (the first Puerto Rican flag) is now considered by many Puerto Ricans to be the symbol of their independence movement. Initially developed to represent the island's struggle to gain its emancipation from Spain, the flag is now used by those supporting the independence of the island from the United States. The flag was displayed during the week of September 17 to 23 of 2018, at the Museum of History, Anthropology and Art located within the University of Puerto Rico, Rio Piedras Campus, to commemorate the 150th anniversary of El Grito de Lares.

Puerto Rico was ceded by Spain in the aftermath of the Spanish–American War under the terms of the Treaty of Paris of 1898 and became a territory of the United States. In 1899, the United States Department of War conducted a census of Puerto Rico finding that the population of Lares was 20,883.

Hurricane Maria on September 20, 2017, triggered numerous landslides in Lares. In many areas of Lares there were more than 25 landslides per square mile due to the significant amount of rainfall.  (Puerto Rico will stand up) became the slogan used across the island to communicate the island would rise again.

When the hurricane hit, many areas in the Municipal Cemetery of Lares were damaged by landslides. Total affected were about 5,000 burial plots, with the burial places shifting and some plots opened. In response, the municipality closed the cemetery to the public. In early 2019, El Nuevo Día newspaper in Puerto Rico began listing the names of the cadavers that would be exhumed and moved to other cemeteries, a long and delicate process. On March 4, an update was given by Lares officials on how the issue was being handled. On May 10, 2019, it was announced that a decision had been made to build a temporary wooden structure separating the affected area so that family members could visit the plots that were unaffected by the hurricane-triggered landslides. The Bravo Family Foundation sent relief to Lares, in the immediate aftermath.

The December 2019 and January 2020 Puerto Rico earthquakes caused 28 families in Lares to lose their homes.

Geography 

Lares is a mountainous municipality located in the central western part of the island of Puerto Rico.

Caves

Barrios

Like all municipalities of Puerto Rico, Lares is divided into barrios.

 Bartolo
 Buenos Aires
 Callejones
 Espino
 Lares
 Lares barrio-pueblo
 La Torre
 Mirasol
 Pezuela
 Piletas
 Pueblo
 Río Prieto

Sectors

Barrios (which are like minor civil divisions) in turn are further subdivided into smaller local populated place areas/units called sectores (which means sectors in English). The types of sectores may vary, from normally sector to urbanización to reparto to barriada to residencial, among others.

Special Communities

 (Special Communities of Puerto Rico) are marginalized communities whose citizens are experiencing a certain amount of social exclusion. A map shows these communities occur in nearly every municipality of the commonwealth. Of the 742 places that were on the list in 2014, the following barrios, communities, sectors, or neighborhoods were in Lares: Castañer, and Seburuquillo.

Tourism

Landmarks and places of interest

Callejones Site — NRHP listed
Downtown Castañer and its former city hall
Hacienda Collazo 
Hacienda El Porvenir
Hacienda Lealtad
Hacienda Los Torres — NRHP listed
Heladería de Lares — ice cream parlor
Mirador Mariana Bracetti
Parque El Jíbaro

Culture

Festivals and events
Lares celebrates its patron saint festival in December. The  is a religious and cultural celebration that generally features parades, games, artisans, amusement rides, regional food, and live entertainment.

Other festivals and events celebrated in Lares include:
Banana Festival – June
Lares Festival – September
Rábano Estate Festival – October
Almojábana Festival – October

Sports
Lares has a professional volleyball team called Patriotas de Lares (Lares Patriots) that have international players including: Brock Ullrich, Gregory Berrios, Ramon "Monchito" Hernandez, and Ariel Rodriguez. The Patriotas won 3 championships, in 1981, 1983 and 2002. In 1981 and 1983 they beat Corozal in the finals and in 2002 they beat Naranjito.
Some of the Native players were: David Vera 1979, Rigoberto Guiyoti 1979, Modesto 1980, Luis Vera 1980, Carlos Vera 1980,

Economy

Lares' economy is primarily agricultural. Harvested products include bananas, coffee, oranges, and tomatoes.

Tourism also plays a significant role in the municipality's economy. The Heladeria de Lares (Lares Ice Cream Shop) is well known around Puerto Rico for its unorthodox selection of ice cream including; rice and beans-flavored ice cream.

There was a large population exodus, out of Lares, after September 20, 2017, when Hurricane Maria struck the island.

In 2016, Rural Opportunities Puerto Rico Inc. (ROPRI) in conjunction with the United States Department of Agriculture (USDA) completed the building of 24 (one-bedroom, two-bedroom and three-bedroom) units in Lares, specifically for farmers (in ), and their families, to live and work. It is called  (Castañer Heights) and there the families work to grow coffee, bananas and other crops which are sold to markets, and restaurants nearby.

Demographics

Like most of Puerto Rico, Lares population originated with the Taino Indians and then many immigrants from Spain settled the central highland, most prominently the Andalusian, Canarian and Extremaduran Spanish migration who formed the bulk of the Jibaro or white peasant stock of the island. The Andalusian, Canarian and Extremaduran Spaniards also influenced much of the Puerto Rican culture which explains the use of Spanish and the Spanish architecture that can be found in the city.

Government

The mayor of Lares for fifteen years was Roberto Pagán Centeno and he resigned in late 2019. José Rodríguez Ruiz began serving his term as mayor of Lares on January 20, 2020. Rodríguez Ruiz belongs to the Hospitaller Order of Saint Lazarus.

The city belongs to the Puerto Rico Senatorial district V, which is represented by two Senators. In 2020, Ramón Ruiz and Marially Gonzalez, from the Popular Democratic Party, were elected as District Senators.

Education

The Héctor Hernández Arana Primary school is located in Lares.

Symbols
The  has an official flag and coat of arms.

Flag
The origins of the municipality's flag can be traced back to the days of the failed 1868 revolt against Spanish rule known as the Grito de Lares. The flag is derived from the Dominican Republic flag of 1844-49 (reflecting the rebel leaders' dream to eventually join with the Dominican Republic and Cuba into one nation) and was knitted by Mariana Bracetti, a revolutionary leader, at the behest of Dr. Ramón Emeterio Betances, the revolt's leader, who designed it. This flag is formed by a white Latin cross in the center. The width of the arms and base are equal to a third part of the latitude of the emblem. It has two quadrilaterals located above and two below the arms of the cross. The superior (top) ones are blue and the inferior (bottom) ones red. A five-point white star is located in the center of the left superior (top) quadrilateral.

Coat of arms
A silver cross is centered on and extends across the shield from side to side and top to bottom; it has blue top quadrants and red bottom quadrants; it has a five pointed silver star in the upper left quadrant. A chain surrounds the shield. The seal is same coat of arms with a scroll and a ribbon in a semicircle with the words: "Lares Ciudad del Grito."

Transportation
Puerto Rico State Route 111 provides access to Lares.

Lares has 15 bridges.

Notable Lareños

 Singer, composer and Virtuoso Guitarist Jose Feliciano who wrote and sang the Feliz Navidad Song, was born in Lares on September 8, 1945 
 Lolita Lebrón was a Puerto Rican nationalist who was convicted of attempted murder and other crimes in 1954 and freed from prison in 1979 after being granted clemency by President Jimmy Carter.
 Denise Quiñones - Miss Universe 2001 
 Luis Hernández Aquino
 Odilio González (born March 5, 1937), known by his stage name El Jibarito de Lares, is a Puerto Rican singer, guitarist and music composer who has been singing and composing for more than 65 years.

Gallery

See also

List of Puerto Ricans
History of Puerto Rico
Did you know-Puerto Rico?

References

External links
 Puerto Rico Government Directory - Lares
 Municipio de Lares on Facebook

 
Municipalities of Puerto Rico
Populated places established in 1827
Aguadilla–Isabela–San Sebastián metropolitan area
1827 establishments in the Spanish Empire